Atlético Petróleos do Huambo or simply Petro do Huambo is an Angolan football club based in Huambo. The club was established in 1980 as a result of a merger between Atlético de Nova Lisboa and Desportivo Sonangol. They are currently playing their home games at the Estádio Mártires da Canhala.

Achievements
Angolan League: 0

Angolan Cup: 0
runner up 1982
Angolan SuperCup: 0

Performance in CAF competitions
CAF Confederation Cup: 1 appearance
2004 – First Round

League & Cup Positions

Chairman history
  Armando Machado
  Armando Cangombe Periquito
  Carlos Alberto Pires "Graça"
  José Sobrinho
  João da Reconciliação André (2012–2016)
  Aníbal Salumbo (2016–present)

Manager history and performance

Players

2001–2014

1991–2000

1981–1990

See also
 Girabola
 Gira Angola

References

Football clubs in Angola
Huambo
Huambo Province
Association football clubs established in 1955
1955 establishments in Angola